This is a list of lighthouses in Chile from Messier Channel to Smyth Channel.

Messier Channel

Baker Channel

Fallos Channel

Grappler Channel

Wide Channel

Trinidad Channel

Concepción Channel

West Channel

Guía Narrows

Esteban Channel

Sarmiento Channel

Collingwood Strait

Última Esperanza Sound

Smyth Channel

See also
List of fjords, channels, sounds and straits of Chile
List of islands of Chile

References
  List of Lights, Radio Aids and Fog Signals: The West Coast of North and South America... National Geospatial-Intelligence Agency. 2013. pp. 20–60.

NGA2044-NGA2324
NGA2044-NGA2324
Lighthouses NGA2044-NGA2324